HMS Isis was one of nine s built for the Royal Navy during the 1930s.

Description
The I-class ships were improved versions of the preceding H-class. They were powered by two Parsons geared steam turbines, each driving one propeller shaft, using steam provided by three Admiralty three-drum boilers. Their crew numbered 145 officers and ratings.

The ships mounted four 4.7-inch (120 mm) Mark IX guns in single mounts, designated 'A', 'B', 'X' and 'Y' from bow to stern. For anti-aircraft (AA) defence, they had two quadruple mounts for the 0.5 inch Vickers Mark III machine gun. The I class was fitted with two above-water quintuple torpedo tube mounts amidships for  torpedoes. One depth charge rack and two throwers were fitted; 16 depth charges were originally carried, but this increased to 35 shortly after the war began. The I-class ships were fitted with the ASDIC sound detection system to locate submarines underwater.

Construction and career
Isis, named for the Egyptian goddess, was laid down by the Yarrow and Company, at Scotstoun in Glasgow on 6 February 1936, launched on 12 November 1936 and commissioned on 2 June 1937. Isis took part in the evacuation of Greece in April 1941.

Isis was hit in 1941 off Beirut, Lebanon after the Battle of Crete. She pursued two Vichy French destroyers which escaped. A Junkers Ju 88 aircraft then attacked and severely damaged her.  tried to tow her to Haifa, Palestine. The tow rope snapped, but the engines were started and she successfully reached Haifa.

Isis struck a mine and sank on 20 July 1944 at the position  in channel 'T' off the western sector of the Normandy landing beaches. She was the last interwar standard destroyer lost in the war, with eleven officers and 143 ratings lost.

Notes

Bibliography
 
 
 
 
 
 
 
 

 

1936 ships
Ships built on the River Clyde
I-class destroyers of the Royal Navy
Ships sunk by mines
World War II destroyers of the United Kingdom
World War II shipwrecks in the English Channel
Maritime incidents in July 1944